Uncial 0311 (in the Gregory-Aland numbering), is a Greek uncial manuscript of the New Testament. Palaeographically it has been assigned to the 8th or the 9th-century.

Description 

The codex contains a small texts of the Epistle to the Romans 8:1-13, on 8 fragments of the one parchment leaf. The original size of the leaf was 25 cm by 22 cm.

It is written in two columns per page, 23 lines per page (survived only 6 lines), in large and leaned uncial letters.

Currently it is dated by the INTF to the 8th or 9th-century.

It is currently housed at the Christopher De Hamel Collection (Gk. Ms 1) in Cambridge.

See also 

 List of New Testament uncials
 Biblical manuscript
 Textual criticism

References

Further reading 

 Peter M. Head, Five New Testament Manuscripts: Recently Discovered Fragments in a Private Collection in Cambridge, JTS, NS, 2008.

External links 
 Images from 0311 at the CSNTM
 "Continuation of the Manuscript List", Institute for New Testament Textual Research, University of Münster. Retrieved April 9, 2008

Greek New Testament uncials
8th-century biblical manuscripts